A wolf whistle is a distinctive two-note glissando whistled sound made to show high interest in or approval of something or someone, especially at someone viewed as physically or sexually attractive. Today, a wolf whistle directed at a person is sometimes considered a precursor to sexual harassment, or a form of sexual harassment in itself.

The name comes from the Wolf character in the popular 1943 Tex Avery cartoon Red Hot Riding Hood who whistles in this way at the sexy female character Red.  He whistles at her in several other subsequent cartoons.  The term appears in North American newspapers as early as 1943. It appears in British newspapers from 1949 onwards.

According to Adam Edwards of Daily Express, the wolf whistle originates from the navy General Call made with a boatswain's pipe. The General Call is made on a ship to get the attention of all hands for an announcement. Sailors in harbour would whistle the General Call upon seeing an attractive woman to draw fellow sailors' attention to her. It was eventually picked up by passers-by, not knowing the real meaning of the whistle, and passed on.  During a 2015 broadcast of A Way with Words, doubt was cast upon this explanation by lexicographer Grant Barrett, who noted that it was very thinly supported.  The Turn To Call  is far closer to the wolf whistle than the General Call.

The standard sound for a coin insertion for the Bally Manufacturing pinball machine "Playboy" (featuring iconography from Playboy magazine) is the wolf whistle.

See also
 Cat-calling

References

External links
 

Whistles